Howard Earle Coffin (September 6, 1873 – November 21, 1937) was an American automobile engineer and industrialist. He was one of the founders of the Hudson Motor Car Company with Roy D. Chapin. He was a charter member of The Society of Automotive Engineers and president in 1910, and as one of the "dollar-a-year men" served as chairman of the Aircraft Board which organized aircraft production and industrial mobilization during World War I. He retired from the Hudson company in 1930 but acted as a consultant. He died accidentally in 1937.

Biography
He was born on September 6, 1873 in West Milton, Ohio, and raised there and in Ann Arbor, Michigan during his early years. He studied mechanical engineering at the University of Michigan. It was there that he constructed his first automobile. It was steam-powered, and he used it to deliver the mail around town. He also made use of the university's engineering shop in 1898–99 to build his first internal combustion engine.

Coffin is known in automotive circles as the Father of Standardization, a result of his initiative in standardizing material and design specifications and in arranging for automobile manufacturers to share their patents. These accomplishments enabled the American automobile industry to grow quickly. Upon graduation in 1902, he started working for Oldsmobile as chief experimental engineer, and later as chief engineer. Roy Chapin and he compiled the first comprehensive instruction book for car owners.

He then worked for the E. R. Thomas–Detroit Motor Car Company. In early May 1906, he was one of the five founders of what became Chalmers–Detroit Motor Company, as first vice-president., He served as vice president and chief engineer of Hudson Motor Car Company, designing many of their early models. With new financing thru one of the six principals, the respected department store merchant and bank officer, Joseph L. Hudson, provided much of the capitalization set at $100,000. The first Hudson, Model 20, was built on July 3, 1909.

A millionaire by age 30, Coffin purchased extensive real estate in Georgia such as Sapelo Island, and Sea Island, turning it into a resort. Coffin married Matilda V. Allen of Battle Creek, Michigan in 1907.

When the United States were confronted with World War I, Coffin joined the Naval Construction Board and was also the chairman of the Committee on Industrial Preparedness in 1916, and in 1917 became chair of the Aircraft Production Board.  After he had resigned under corruption allegations in March, President Wilson appointed John D. Ryan in April 1918 to replace Coffin as head of the board.

He inadvertently killed himself at Sea Island on November 21, 1937, the result of a gunshot wound from his favorite rifle. He and his wife are buried at Christ Church at St. Simons Island, Georgia.

References

External links

 

1873 births
1937 deaths
People from West Milton, Ohio
People from Glynn County, Georgia
Businesspeople from Ann Arbor, Michigan
Engineers from Ohio
University of Michigan College of Engineering alumni
American automotive engineers
American industrialists
Hudson Motor Car Company
American founders of automobile manufacturers
Naval Consulting Board
Council of National Defense